The Socotra worm snake (Xerotyphlops socotranus) is a species of snake in the Typhlopidae family. It is found only on the island of Socotra in Yemen.

First description 
 George Albert Boulenger, 1889 : Descriptions of new Typhlopidæ in the British Museum. Annals and Magazine of Natural History, ser. 6, vol. 4, p. 360-363 (read online).

References

Xerotyphlops
Reptiles described in 1889
Endemic fauna of Socotra